BarNone (1-800-BarNone) is a lead generation company based in Oakland, California, USA. BarNone was founded in 1995, and was later purchased by the First Advantage Corporation in 2005 for their Dealer Services segment. They were later sold to Centrro, Inc. in August 2009.

BarNone connects consumers seeking an auto loan with auto dealerships. Consumers are targeted through direct mail, television ads, and internet marketing. BarNone targets consumers who typically have bad credit that need help with an auto loan.

In 2002, BarNone Inc. acquired rights to "adopt" the former Pets.com sock puppet, portrayed by Michael Ian Black, in their advertisements, replacing Fran Tarkenton. BarNone's slogan is "Everyone Deserves A Second Chance".

Notes

External links
 BarNone official web site
 BarNone Dealer site 
 FADV Parent Company site

Marketing companies established in 1995
Companies based in Oakland, California